Monte Lewis Bennett is a former American football defensive end & nose tackle who played for the New Orleans Saints in 1981. Bennett played in the USFL for three seasons with the Oakland Invaders. Bennett played in the 1985 USFL championship game. After three years in the USFL. Bennett returned for another season in the NFL playing with the San Diego Chargers in  1987.

While playing with the Invaders Bennett wore #91

Early years
Monte was born on April 27, 1959 in Sterling, Colorado. His family moved to Sterling, Kansas almost a year later. He attended Sterling High School.

College
Monte attended Kansas State University from 1977 to 1981. He played Nose Tackle in college.

Professional career
Monte went undrafted in the 1981 Draft, with teammate Stevan Dion Clark being picked up by the New England Patriots. He was signed by the New Orleans Saints in 1981 and played in all 16 games, starting 6 of them. At the end of the year, he was cut. In 1987, at the age of 28, he was signed by the San Diego Chargers, who switched him from Nose tackle to Defensive end. He only played 3 games that year before being cut.

External links
NFL.com Player Profile
Database Football Profile
Pro Football Reference Profile

1959 births
Living people
People from Sterling, Kansas
American football defensive ends
Kansas State Wildcats football players
New Orleans Saints players
San Diego Chargers players
Oakland Invaders players
People from Sterling, Colorado